Duna wine region (also called Alföld wine region) is the largest of the seven larger wine regions of Hungary, stretching between the rivers Danube and Tisza. It consists of three continuous wine regions with similar conditions: Csongrád, Hajós-Baja and Kunság. Its area is mostly flat; the typical soil is sand and occasionally loess. Its climate is favourable to growing grapes, but weather extremities are frequent. Formerly, it was known for its light sand wines.

Wine regions

References 

Wine regions of Hungary